Dornoch in Sutherland was a royal burgh that returned one commissioner to the Parliament of Scotland and to the Convention of Estates.

After the Acts of Union 1707, Dornoch, Dingwall, Kirkwall, Tain and Wick formed the Tain district of burghs, returning one member between them to the House of Commons of Great Britain.

List of burgh commissioners

 1661: Alexander Gordon 
 1685–86, 1689 (convention), 1689–90: Captain George Gordon (died c.1692) 
 1692–1702: John Anderson the younger of Westertoun 
 1702–07: John Urquhart of Meldrum

See also
 List of constituencies in the Parliament of Scotland at the time of the Union

References

Constituencies of the Parliament of Scotland (to 1707)
Constituencies disestablished in 1707
1707 disestablishments in Scotland
Politics of Highland (council area)
Dornoch